Konchalovsky is a Russian surname.

Notable people with this surname include:
Pyotr Konchalovsky (1876–1956), Russian painter;
Andrei Konchalovsky (born 1937), Russian film writer and director, grandson of Pyotr.